White River Water Aerodrome  is located  north northeast of White River, Ontario, Canada.

References

Registered aerodromes in Algoma District
Seaplane bases in Ontario